George J. "Rook" Woodward (October 25, 1894 – December 27, 1968) was an American football player and coach of football and basketball.

Coaching career

Fort Hays State
Woodward was the fifth head college football coach for the Fort Hays State University Tigers located in Hays, Kansas and he held that position for three seasons, from 1920 until 1922. Football legend Walter Camp called the 1922 team "a well disciplined organization that fought as a unit.

Washburn
Woodward left Fort Hays to become the 18th head football coach for Washburn University in Topeka, Kansas and he held that position for four seasons, from 1923 until 1926. His overall coaching record at Washburn was 7 wins, 23 losses, and 4 ties. This ranks him 21st at Washburn in terms of total wins and 32nd at Washburn in terms of winning percentage.

Later life
In 1938, Woodward led an insurance organization in Cincinnati, Ohio. He died in a car accident near Chillicothe, Missouri in 1968. He had been living in Columbus, Missouri at the time and was 74 years old.

Head coaching record

Football

References

External links
 

1894 births
1968 deaths
American football running backs
Basketball coaches from Kansas
Fort Hays State Tigers football coaches
Fort Hays State Tigers men's basketball coaches
Kansas Jayhawks football players
Washburn Ichabods football coaches
Washburn Ichabods athletic directors
College men's basketball head coaches in the United States
People from Douglas County, Kansas
People from Johnson County, Missouri
Players of American football from Kansas
Road incident deaths in Missouri